José Enrique Díaz Barrera (born 7 April 1953) is a Spanish football manager.

Managerial career
Born in Seville, Andalusia, Díaz made his managerial debut with Tercera División side Riotinto Balompié, and subsequently led Betis Deportivo to Segunda División B in 1985. After stints at Atlético Sanluqueño CF, Granada CF, CP Mérida and Xerez CD in division three, he returned to Mérida in 1992, with the club now in Segunda División.

In the 1992 summer Díaz was named CD Badajoz manager. In 1994, after a year at Levante UD, he was appointed at the helm of UD Almería and led the club to its first promotion to the second level ever.

Díaz subsequently managed Écija Balompié and Levante in the second level, being sacked by the latter on 24 November 1997. He resumed his career in the third level, managing Xerez, Cultural y Deportiva Leonesa, AD Ceuta (three spells) and Cádiz CF; he was also Andalusia Football Federation's manager for eight years.

References

External links

1953 births
Living people
Sportspeople from Seville
Spanish football managers
Segunda División managers
Segunda División B managers
Tercera División managers
Granada CF managers
CP Mérida managers
Xerez CD managers
CD Badajoz managers
Levante UD managers
UD Almería managers
Écija Balompié managers
Cultural Leonesa managers
AD Ceuta managers
Cádiz CF managers